Prins van Oranje or Prinses van Oranje may refer to:

Prince of Orange, a title given to the male heir apparent of the Dutch throne
Princess of Orange, the title given to the female heir apparent of the throne

Prins van Oranje or De Prins van Oranje may also refer to:

People
Willem, Prins van Oranje (1815–40)
Willem, Prins van Oranje (1840–49)
Willem, Prins van Oranje (1849–79)
Alexander, Prins van Oranje (1879–84)
Willem-Alexander, Prins van Oranje (1980-2013)
Catharina-Amalia, Prinses van Oranje (since 2013)

Military
, a class of two minelayers in service with the Royal Netherlands Navy from 1932–43
Regiment Huzaren Prins van Oranje, an armoured regiment of the Royal Netherlands Army.

Windmills
De Prins Van Oranje, Bredevoort, a windmill in Gelderland
De Prins Van Oranje, Buren, a windmill in Gelderland